Corwin Carl Guell (December 22, 1909 – December 1976) was a member of the Wisconsin State Assembly.

Biography
Guell was born Corwin Carl Guell on December 22, 1909, in Fond du Lac, Wisconsin. He was later a resident of Thorp, Wisconsin, where he worked as an attorney. In 1932, he married Anna L. Zimmerman. They had three children. He attended North Central College, Northwestern University and the University of Wisconsin Law School. During World War II, he served as an officer in the United States Navy. He was also active in his local Methodist church, serving as a lay speaker.

Political career
Guell was a member of the Assembly from 1957 to 1958. He also made an unsuccessful run for the Assembly in 1960. Guell was a Republican.

References

Politicians from Fond du Lac, Wisconsin
People from Thorp, Wisconsin
Wisconsin lawyers
Military personnel from Wisconsin
United States Navy officers
United States Navy personnel of World War II
North Central College alumni
Northwestern University alumni
University of Wisconsin Law School alumni
1909 births
1976 deaths
20th-century American lawyers
20th-century American politicians
Republican Party members of the Wisconsin State Assembly